Ralph Lorenzo Nelson (born January 23, 1954) is a former American football running back in the National Football League for the Washington Redskins and Seattle Seahawks.  He did not attend college.

1954 births
Living people
Players of American football from Los Angeles
American football running backs
Washington Redskins players
Seattle Seahawks players